Horst Janson may refer to:

H. W. Janson (1913–1982), American scholar of art history
Horst Janson (actor) (born 1935), German actor